Merkurios (reigned 697 - c. 722) was ruler of the Nubian kingdom of Makuria. Authorities believe that during his reign Makuria absorbed the Nubian kingdom of Nobatia.

Reign
According to P.L. Shinnie, the first year of Merkurios' reign can be dated by an inscription on the foundation stone in Faras, which was dated to AD 707, and also to Merkurios' eleventh regnal year. In 710, Merkurios erected an inscription at Taifa, which indicates that his kingdom had united with Nobatia by that date.

John the Deacon, an Egyptian Christian writing around 768, described Merkurios as the "New Constantine", which Shinnie interprets as evidence that Merkurios played some important role in the Nubian church.

References

Nubian people
Kingdom of Makuria
8th-century monarchs in Africa
7th-century births
720s deaths